The Academy for Innovative Studies are two campuses located on Diamond Avenue and First Avenue in Evansville, Indiana, USA. It is a member of the Evansville Vanderburgh School Corporation. In 2012, the EVSC School Board decided to invest more money in students who are at risk and learn differently from traditional student and open another AIS campus. The new AIS campus at the old North High School was opened in fall 2012.

Reason for AIS
"We have outstanding traditional schools, but they're equipped to deal with traditional students," EVSC Superintendent David Smith said. "So we have additional layers of support at both campuses of AIS."

Details

AIS is an alternative school with two campuses.  Open to students in grades 6 to 12, the Academy for Innovative Studies - Diamond Campus, offers a non-traditional learning environment geared to addressing the holistic needs of all students. Prior to enrollment, each student has an Individualized Education Plan or Individualized Service Plan. AIS Diamond students have the possibility of graduating with a Core 40 Diploma or earning their GED. With smaller class sizes each student has the opportunity for more individualized attention and instruction.  On-site counseling and assessments, provided by community partners, is available to all qualifying students at our Diamond Campus.

There are two AIS campuses: AIS First Avenue (Old Harwood) and old North AIS Diamond.

References

Schools in Evansville, Indiana
Public schools in Indiana
2012 establishments in Indiana